Stenoscaptia aroa is a moth in the family Erebidae. It is found in New Guinea.

References

Natural History Museum Lepidoptera generic names catalog

Lithosiini
Moths described in 1904